The Coastal Canyon League (CCL) is a high school athletic conference that is affiliated with the CIF Southern Section (CIF-SS). The league was established in 2014 during the CIF-SS Northern Area's biennial releaguing process, drawing several members from the Marmonte League as well as Camarillo and Oak Park high schools. All members are located in Ventura County.

Member schools

Current
 Camarillo High School (2014–present)
 Moorpark High School (2014–present)
 Oak Park High School (2014–present)
 Royal High School (2014–present)
 Simi Valley High School (2014–present)

Former
 Agoura High School (2018–2020; joined Marmonte League)
 Calabasas High School (swimming and water polo only)

Sports
The Coastal Canyon League sponsors the following sports:

Fall season
 Cross country
 Boys' water polo
 Girls' golf
 Girls' tennis
 Girls' volleyball

Winter season
 Basketball
 Soccer
 Wrestling
 Girls' water polo

Spring season
 Baseball
 Competitive cheerleading
 Boys' golf
 Lacrosse
 Softball
 Swimming
 Track and field
 Boys' tennis
 Boys' volleyball

Notes

References

External links

CIF Southern Section leagues
Sports in Ventura County, California